The Port Lincoln Football League is an Australian rules football competition based at the southern extremity of the Eyre Peninsula region of South Australia, Australia.  It is an affiliated member of the South Australian National Football League.
Port Lincoln Football League games are officiated by the Port Lincoln Football League Umpires Association.

Brief history 
The league was originally formed in 1910 as the Port Lincoln Football Association.

The league was reformed in 1946 (having been in recess during World War II) under its current title of Port Lincoln Football League.  At that time the participating clubs were Lincoln South, Tasman and Waybacks.

Marble Range rejoined the league in 1953 from the Great Flinders FL, having been a member of the PLFA before World War II.  Their re-entry was conditional on a probation period where they would only play B Grade until winning a premiership in this division, which they achieved in 1956 and were promoted to the senior division.

Tumby Bay and Eyre United joined the league after the Eastern Eyre Football Association folded after the 1961 season, although both clubs eventually moved to the Great Flinders FL, Eyre United in 1971 and Tumby Bay in 1981.

Boston and Mallee Park were formed to join the Port Lincoln FL in 1972 and 1980 respectively.

2010 Controversy
On 17 July 2010 Boston forfeited all matches to Mallee Park citing issues with on field violence and a refusal by the league to take action to prevent it. The club has alleged that it could be facing expulsion from the league for taking this action.

Current clubs 
{| class="wikitable sortable"
|-
! Jumper
! Club
! Nickname
! Location
! Years in comp
! PLFL premierships
! Premiership years
|-
| 
| Boston
| Tigers
| Port Lincoln
| 1972-
| 1
| 1986
|-
|
| Lincoln South
| Eagles| Port Lincoln
| 1946-
| 12
| 1946, 1952, 1954, 1957, 1964, 1969, 1970, 1972, 1981, 1983, 1991, 2002
|-
|
| Mallee Park
| Peckers| Port Lincoln
| 1980-
| 16
| 1985, 1987-88-89-90, 1993-94-95-96, 1999, 2001, 2009-10-11, 2015-16
|-
| 
| Marble Range
| Magpies| Wangary
| 1938–1946, 1957-
| 12
| 1940–41, 1978, 1982, 1997, 1998, 2000, 2004, 2006–07, 2021-22
|-
| 
| Tasman
| Roosters| Port Lincoln
| 1946-
| 15
| 1947, 1949–50, 1961–62, 1965, 1967, 1977, 1992, 2012-13-14, 2018-19-20
|-
|  
| Wayback
| Demons| Port Lincoln
| 1903-
| 33
| 1910–11, 1915, 1924–25, 1929-30-31-32-33-34, 1948, 1951, 1953, 1955–66, 1958-59-60, 1963, 1966, 1971, 1973-74-75-76, 1979–80, 1984, 2003, 2005, 2008, 2017 
|-
|}

Notable former players
A number of players from the Port Lincoln FL clubs have gone on to play professionally in the SANFL and AFL.  The team with most players to do so at any one time is Mallee Park, who have direct player/team relationships with at least 11 current indigenous players on 6 AFL team lists, including Graham Johncock, Eddie Betts, Harry Miller, Russell Coulthard, Daniel Wells, Lindsay Thomas, Byron Pickett and brothers Peter and Shaun Burgoyne.

Mallee Park also has a direct relationship with some other Indigenous players whose fathers have played for the club in its early foundation years in the early 1980s.

 Premiers 

1910 Wayback
1911 Wayback
1912 Railways
1913 Tumby Bay
1914 Port Lincoln
1915 Wayback
1916-1918 Recess1919 Rovers
1920 Rovers
1921 Boston Bay
1922 Rovers
1923 Rovers
1924 Wayback
1925 Wayback
1926 Rovers
1927 Boston Bay
1928 Boston Bay
1929 Wayback
1930 Wayback
1931 Wayback
1932 Wayback
1933 Wayback
1934 Wayback
1935 Centrals
1936 Centrals
1937 Centrals
1938 Centrals
1939 Kirtonians
1940 Marble Range
1941 Marble Range
1942-1945 Recess''

1946 Lincoln South
1947 Tasman
1948 Wayback
1949 Tasman
1950 Tasman
1951 Wayback
1952 Lincoln South
1953 Wayback
1954 Lincoln South
1955 Wayback
1956 Wayback
1957 Lincoln South
1958 Tasman
1959 Wayback
1960 Wayback
1961 Tasman
1962 Tasman
1963 Wayback
1964 Lincoln South
1965 Tasman
1966 Wayback
1967 Tasman
1968 Tumby Bay
1969 Lincoln South
1970 Lincoln South
1971 Wayback
1972 Lincoln South
1973 Wayback
1974 Wayback
1975 Wayback
1976 Wayback

1977 Tasman
1978 Marble Range
1979 Wayback
1980 Wayback
1981 Lincoln South
1982 Marble Range
1983 Lincoln South
1984 Wayback
1985 Mallee Park
1986 Boston
1987 Mallee Park
1988 Mallee Park
1989 Mallee Park
1990 Mallee Park
1991 Lincoln South
1992 Tasman
1993 Mallee Park
1994 Mallee Park
1995 Mallee Park
1996 Mallee Park
1997 Marble Range
1998 Marble Range
1999 Mallee Park
2000 Marble Range
2001 Mallee Park
2002 Lincoln South
2003 Wayback
2004 Marble Range 
2005 Wayback
2006 Marble Range
2007 Marble Range

2008 Wayback
2009 Mallee Park
2010 Mallee Park
2011 Mallee Park
2012 Tasman
2013 Tasman
2014 Tasman
2015 Mallee Park
2016 Mallee Park
2017 Wayback
2018 Tasman
2019 Tasman
2020 Tasman
2021 Marble Range
2022 Marble Range

2006 Ladder

2007 Ladder

2008 Ladder

2009 Ladder

2010 Ladder

2011 Ladder

2012 Ladder

2013 Ladder

2014 Ladder

2015 Ladder

2016 Ladder

2017 Ladder

2018 Ladder

External links 
 Country Footy
 Official website

Books
 Encyclopedia of South Australian country football clubs / compiled by Peter Lines. 
 South Australian country football digest / by Peter Lines

References 

Eyre Peninsula
Australian rules football competitions in South Australia